Eliane René Schianni Bidart (stage name, Beba Bidart; April 3, 1924 – August 27, 1994), was an Argentine tango singer, actress and dancer. 

Eliane René Schianni Bidart was born April 3, 1924 in Buenos Aires.
She began her studies at the age of ten at Teatro Infantil Labardén. She made thirty tango recordings accompanied by the Francisco Canaro's orchestra and others. Her very first film was Los Pulpos "Octopussy" (1948) opening out her path for acting on as many as thirty movies in total. She had been in a 12-year relationship with TV host Cacho Fontana She adopted a child, Paulo soon after her divorce from Mr. Fontana. She died of a heart attack on August 27, 1994.

Filmography 

 Funes, un gran amor (1993)
 Susana quiere, el negro también! (1987)
 Buenos Aires Tango (1982)
 El bromista (1981)
 El infierno tan temido (1980)
 La parte del león (1978)
 Los chicos crecen (1976)
 Rolando Rivas, taxista (1974)
 Con alma y vida (1970)
 Los muchachos de antes no usaban gomina (1969)
 Villa Cariño está que arde (1968)
 Esta noche mejor no (1965)
 Cuidado con las colas (1964)
 Buenas noches, Buenos Aires (1964)
 La sentencia (1964)
 La calesita (1963)
 El mago de las finanzas (1962)
 El satélite chiflado (1956)
 La niña del gato (1953)
 La casa grande (1953)
 El baldío (1952)
 La bestia debe morir (1952)
 Especialista en señoras (1951)
 La Vendedora de fantasías (1950)
 Toscanito y los detectives (1950)
 Nacha Regules (1950)
 Una noche en el Ta Ba Rin (1949)
 ¿Por qué mintió la cigüeña? (1949)
 Una atrevida aventurita (1948)
 Los pulpos (1948)
 La serpiente de cascabel (1948)
 Los verdes paraísos (1947)
 El que recibe las bofetadas (1947)
 El muerto falta a la cita (1944)

References

Bibliography

External links

1924 births
1994 deaths
Singers from Buenos Aires
Tango singers
Argentine film actresses
Argentine female dancers
Actresses from Buenos Aires
20th-century Argentine women singers
20th-century Argentine actresses